MS Oosterdam is a cruise ship of Holland America Line, a division of Carnival Corporation & plc. The ship's name is derived from the Dutch translation for the eastern compass point, and is pronounced "OH-ster-dam."

Christening

Oosterdam was christened by Princess Margriet of the Netherlands. The ceremony took place in Holland America Line's founding city, Rotterdam on 29 July 2003. The event was held over three days of celebrations marking the company's 130th anniversary. The joint flagship of the fleet, joined Oosterdam "bow-to-bow" in welcoming her to the fleet.

Technical information
The machinery spaces aboard Oosterdam are vast and extend along two of its lowest decks for the most part of the vessel.

MS Oosterdam is powered by a CODAG propulsion system encompassing five (three 16-cylinder and two 12-cylinder) Sulzer ZAV40S diesel engines (built under license by Grandi Motori Trieste, now owned by Wärtsilä, in Trieste, Italy) and a GE LM2500 gas turbine, making it one of only a handful of merchant vessels that is powered by such an arrangement. It is propelled by two 17.62 MW (23956.53 ps), 160rpm synchronous freshwater-cooled ABB Azipod propulsors.

Its two engine rooms are separated by a watertight bulkhead division. Each engine room has its own fuel, lubricating, cooling and electrical distribution systems and is fully independent of the other.

The ship's potable water is produced by three large Alfa Laval multi-effect flash evaporating desalination plants.

History of the name Oosterdam
While no prior ship has been named Oosterdam, the first vessel with the "Ooster" prefix launched 1913 as the 8,251-ton, one-prop Oosterdijk. At the time, "dijk" or "dyk" was the suffix used for cargo vessels, "dam" was used for passenger ships. She sailed between Rotterdam and Savannah, Georgia for Holland America as well as serving the Allied war effort during World War I.

Areas of operation
The ship has been alternating fall/winter cruises along the Mexican Riviera and summer in Alaska. In the autumn of 2011, she visited Hawaii for the first time. After January 2012, Holland America paused visits to Mexico's west coast, in part due to safety concerns there in connection to the Mexican Drug War and in part due to the depressed cruise market in Southern California; the Oosterdam shifted to Hawaii, Australia, and the South Pacific. Holland America was the first cruise line to resume service to Mazatlán in the autumn of 2013 with MS Veendam, and Oosterdam followed suit shortly thereafter. On 4 May 2019 Oosterdam collided with  while docking stern to stern in Vancouver, British Columbia. There were no injuries reported and disembarkation on both ships proceeded as usual.

References

External links 

 Holland America Line official site

2002 ships
Ships of the Holland America Line
Ships built in Venice
Panamax cruise ships
Ships built by Fincantieri